Krásno is a village and municipality in Partizánske District in the Trenčín Region of western Slovakia.

History
In historical records the village was first mentioned in 1078.

Geography
The municipality lies at an altitude of 210 metres and covers an area of 3.608 km². It has a population of about 490 people.

References

External links

 Official page
https://web.archive.org/web/20080111223415/http://www.statistics.sk/mosmis/eng/run.html

Villages and municipalities in Partizánske District